Fotbal Fulnek is an association football team from Fulnek in the Czech Republic, as of the 2016–17 season playing in the seventh level of the Czech football league. In the 2009–2010 season, the club played in the Moravian–Silesian Football League (third-level league) but did not fulfil their fixtures and their results for the season were expunged in February 2010.

The best achievement of the club was a presence in the Second League in the 2007–08 and 2008–09 seasons.

Honours
Moravian–Silesian Football League (third tier)
 Champions 2006–07

References

External links
  

Football clubs in the Czech Republic
Nový Jičín District